Ping Yan Court is a private estate developed by the Hong Kong Housing Authority located at 65 Ping Ha Road, Ping Shan, Yuen Long District, New Territories, Hong Kong.

It comprises three 35-storey domestic blocks with 2,409 flats in total. It is actually located at Ping Shan rather than Tin Shui Wai although it is just next to MTR Tin Shui Wai station and Tin Shing Court.

The flats were sold in 2016 and commenced in 2018.

Blocks

Nearby Buildings
Tin Shui Wai station
Tin Shing Court

References

Ping Shan
Home Ownership Scheme
Residential buildings completed in 2018
2018 establishments in Hong Kong